From Dusk is the third studio album by Japanese indie rock band Guitar Vader, released on November 9, 2001.

Track listing
"パーフェクトバード" – 4:13
"CUTTING! EVIL SMILE" – 4:27
"BABY-T" - 1:42
"The Time slips away" - 3:38
"Goodness Happiness" - 3:02
"やわらかい" - 3:14
"島流し" - 2:59
"GVTV" - 3:19
"太陽" - 3:41
"REFUND GAME" - 4:08
"HEAVY METAL COLLECTOR" - 5:44

References

2001 albums
Guitar Vader albums